The Alden Bridge is a historic bridge in Alden, Iowa, which carries the town's Main Street over the Iowa River, United States. It was built in 1936 to replace an earlier wooden bridge that had begun to deteriorate. The Weldon Brothers Construction Company supervised the bridge's construction, while the Iowa State Highway Commission designed the structure; it was one of the first bridges designed by the ISHC, which used similar plans for many other bridges in the state. Labor for the construction effort came from the Works Progress Administration, providing jobs for many of Hardin County's unemployed residents. The bridge was dedicated on July 4, 1936, as part of Alden's Independence Day celebrations.

The Alden Bridge was listed on the National Register of Historic Places on May 15, 1998.

See also
List of bridges documented by the Historic American Engineering Record in Iowa

References

External links

Road bridges on the National Register of Historic Places in Iowa
Bridges completed in 1936
Bridges in Hardin County, Iowa
Historic American Engineering Record in Iowa
National Register of Historic Places in Hardin County, Iowa
Concrete bridges in the United States